Dappula III was King of Anuradhapura in the 9th century CE, whose reign lasted from 827 to 843 CE. He succeeded his brother Aggabodhi VIII as King of Anuradhapura and was succeeded by his son Aggabodhi IX.

See also
 List of Sri Lankan monarchs
 History of Sri Lanka

References

External links
 Kings & Rulers of Sri Lanka
 Codrington's Short History of Ceylon

Monarchs of Anuradhapura
D
D
D